Elle Bennetts (born 6 September 1989) is an Australian rules footballer playing for the Western Bulldogs in the AFL Women's (AFLW) competition. She has previously played for Greater Western Sydney. She is also an ex Physical Education and Health teacher at Star of the Sea College in Melbourne.

Australian rules football
Bennetts was signed by Greater Western Sydney as a rookie signing in May 2017 after never previously having played competitive football. She was promoted to the Greater Western Sydney's main playing list following an injury to Alex Saundry and subsequently made her debut in the six point loss to Melbourne at Casey Fields in the opening round of the 2018 season.

In June 2021, Bennetts was traded to the Western Bulldogs in exchange for pick no. 28. She was given the #11 guernsey.

Netball
Bennetts has played netball with Victorian Fury in the Australian Netball League between 2012 and 2017.
Bennetts played her first game with New South Wales Swifts in the 2019 Suncorp Super Netball season as a Wing Attack on Sunday June 16 2019 with a 59–55 win over the Giants.

Statistics
Statistics are correct to the end of the 2021 season.

|- style="background-color: #eaeaea"
| scope=row style="text-align:center" | 2018 || 
| 22 || 7 || 0 || 1 || 43 || 26 || 69 || 17 || 23 || 0.0 || 0.1 || 6.1 || 3.7 || 9.9 || 2.4 || 3.3 || 2
|- 
! scope="row" style="text-align:center" | 2019
|style="text-align:center;"|
| 22 || 7 || 0 || 3 || 49 || 27 || 76 || 10 || 11 || 0.0 || 0.4 || 7.0 || 3.9 || 10.9 || 1.4 || 1.6 || 0
|- style="background-color: #eaeaea"
! scope="row" style="text-align:center" | 2020
|style="text-align:center;"|
| 22 || 7 || 0 || 0 || 49 || 38 || 87 || 21 || 13 || 0.0 || 0.0 || 7.0 || 5.4 || 12.4 || 3.0 || 1.9 || 0
|- 
! scope="row" style="text-align:center" | 2021
|style="text-align:center;"|
| 22 || 9 || 2 || 2 || 68 || 65 || 133 || 28 || 16 || 0.2 || 0.2 || 7.6 || 7.2 || 14.8 || 3.1 || 1.8 || 0
|- class="sortbottom"
! colspan=3| Career
! 30
! 2
! 6
! 209
! 156
! 365
! 76
! 63
! 0.1
! 0.2
! 7.0
! 5.2
! 12.2
! 2.5
! 2.1
! 2
|}

References

External links 

1989 births
Living people
Greater Western Sydney Giants (AFLW) players
Australian rules footballers from Victoria (Australia)
Australian netball players
New South Wales Swifts players
Suncorp Super Netball players
Victorian Netball League players
Australian Netball League players
Victorian Fury players
Netball New South Wales Waratahs players
Western Bulldogs (AFLW) players
New South Wales state netball league players